Callionymus guentheri, Günther’s deepwater dragonet, is a species of dragonet endemic to the Pacific waters of the Philippines. The specific name honours the ichthyologist Albert Günther (1830-1914).

References 

G
Fish described in 1981
Taxa named by Ronald Fricke